is a Japanese actor, voice actor and singer who was born in Tokorozawa, Saitama. He is married to voice actress Rikako Aikawa. Mania.com praised him as "truly one of the greatest seiyuu". Otakunews.com complimented him for the role of Tetsuya from Outlanders. Mania.com comments on his role of Kintaro Oe (Golden Boy) that he "practiced months before hand, to the point of going hoarse from overwork, to perfect Kintaro's voice" and "there's no one who could replace him for this role". He is also known for the role of Kaneda in the 1988 anime film Akira and won the 7th Seiyu Awards for Best Personality in 2013.  He was previously affiliated with Office Osawa and Across Entertainment, but is currently affiliated with Aoni Production.

Filmography

Television animation
DNA^2 (1994) (Kakimaro Someya)
Hikaru no Go (2002) (Atsushi Kurata)
Inuyasha (2004) (Suzaku)
Futari wa Pretty Cure Splash Star (2006) (Dorodoron)
Hayate the Combat Butler (2007) (Akane Himegami)
One Piece (2010) (Emporio Ivankov, 2nd voice)
Panty & Stocking with Garterbelt (2010) (Ghost) [Episode 1 Part 2: "Death Race 2010"]
Kill la Kill (2013) (Takaharu Fukuroda)
World Trigger (2014) (Isami Tōma)
Space Patrol Luluco (2016) (Keiji)
March Comes in like a Lion (2016) (Manabu Yasui)
100% Pascal-sensei (2017) (Demon Pascal (ep. 3)/Demon Pascal D (ep. 8), Hell Emperor Pascal (ep. 23))
Demon Slayer: Kimetsu no Yaiba (2019) (Toyo)
Jujutsu Kaisen (2020) (Kiyotaka Ijichi)
Dragon Quest: The Adventure of Dai (2020) (Zaboera)
Edens Zero (2021) (Mosco Versa-0)
Getter Robo Arc (2021) (Captain Misa Igari, General Basilisk)
Lucifer and the Biscuit Hammer (2022) (Lee Soleil)
MF Ghost (2023) (Itsuki Takeuchi)

Adventures of Mini-Goddess (Gan-chan)
Angelique (Zephel)
Arad Senki: Slap Up Party (Harusen)BECK (Tanabe)Brigadoon  (Mike White)Cyborg 009 (Pyunma/Cyborg 008)D.Gray-man (Arystar Krory)Daphne in the Brilliant Blue (Tsutomu Hanaoka)DC Super Heroes vs. Eagle Talon (Penguin)Digimon Frontier (Piddomon)Dōbutsu no Mori, the film adaptation of the Animal Crossing video game series (Kappei/Kapp'n)Doki Doki School Hours (Gen Nakamura ("Oyaji"))Dragon Ball Super (Champa, Majora)Gonna be the Twin-Tail!! (Owl Guildy)
Haven't You Heard? I'm Sakamoto (Fukase)
I'm Gonna Be An Angel! (Dispel)
Initial D (Itsuki Takeuchi (Iggy Takeuchi))
King of Braves GaoGaiGar (Mic Sounders)
Magica Wars (Toro)
Mirmo! (Incho)
Nurarihyon no Mago (Ungaikyo)
Oruchuban Ebichu (Maa-kun)
Please Teacher! (Hyosuke Magumo)
Saiki Kusuo no Psi-nan (Kuniharu Saiki)
Shakugan no Shana (Marchosias)
Shakugan no Shana Second (Marchosias)
Shakugan no Shana III Final (Marchosias)
Shirobako (Yoshikazu Inanami, Tomigaya)
Sonic the Hedgehog (Rotor the Walrus (also voiced by Kozo Shioya))
Toriko (Sunny)
Vandread (Pyoro)
Yagami-kun's Family Affairs (Ichigaya)
Beyblade: Metal Fusion (Brazilian Blader DJ)

Animated films
Akira (1988) (Kaneda)
Dead Leaves (2004) (666 (Three-Six))

Original video animation (OVA)
Bludgeoning Angel Dokuro-Chan (xxxx) (Binkan Salaryman)
Golden Boy (xxxx) (Kintaro Oe)
My Dear Marie (xxxx) (Hiroshi)
Irresponsible Captain Tylor (xxxx) (Kojiro)
Outlanders (xxxx) (Tetsuya)
Shakugan no Shana (xxxx) (Marcosias)
Yondemasuyo, Azazel-san (xxxx) (Seiya)
Onegai Twins (xxxx) (Hyosuke Magumo)
Here is Greenwood (1991) (Mitsuru)

Video games
Gitaroo Man (xxxx) (Puma)
Initial D Arcade Stage (xxxx) (Itsuki Takeuchi)
Sonic the Hedgehog (xxxx) (Orbot)
Street Fighter III: Third Strike (1999) (Sean) 
The King of Fighters '99 Evolution (2000) (Syo Kirishima)
The King of Fighters 2000 (2000) (Syo Kirishima)
Kingdom Hearts (2002) (Peter Pan)
The King of Fighters 2002 (2002) (Kusanagi, as "???")
The King of Fighters 2003 (2003) (Kusanagi)
Tales of Vesperia (2008) (Yeager)
The King of Fighters Neowave (2005) (Kusanagi)
The King of Fighters 2002: Unlimited Match (2009) (Kusanagi)
The King of Fighter for Girls (2020) (Choi Bounge)

Drama CDs
Abunai series 4: Abunai Campus Love (Sakura Nanba)
Eden wo Tooku ni Hanarete series 2: Ryokuin no Rakuen (Masayuki Kawahara)
Eden wo Tooku ni Hanarete series 3: Setsunai Yoru no Rakuen (Masayuki Kawahara)
Mainichi Seiten! series 1 (Jou Obinata)
Mainichi Seiten! series 2: Kodomo wa Tomaranai (Jou Obinata)
Ourin Gakuen series 1: Ikenai Seitokaishitsu (Kyouhei Fukazawa)
Rolex ni Kuchizukewo (Chikao Ootsuka)
Sakurazawa vs Hakuhou series 1: Shokuinshitsu de Naisho no Romance (Kyousuku Sonoda)

Tokusatsu
Kaizoku Sentai Gokaiger (2011) (Bibaboo (ep. 44))
Shuriken Sentai Ninninger (2015) (Youkai Enraenra (ep. 11))
Doubutsu Sentai Zyuohger (2016) (Quval (eps. 1 - 27, 30 - 42))
Doubutsu Sentai Zyuohger vs. Ninninger the Movie: Super Sentai's Message from the Future (2017) (Quval)
Samurai Sentai Shinkenger (2009) (Ayakashi Sogizarai (ep. 36))
Mashin Sentai Kiramager (2020-2021) Mashin Shovellow

Dubbing roles

Live-action
10 Things I Hate About You (Michael Eckman (David Krumholtz))
Enchanted (Pip)
Evolution (2005 NTV edition) (Danny Donald (Michael Bower))
The Final Destination (Hunt Wynorski (Nick Zano))
Ghostbusters (Rowan North (Neil Casey))
Jurassic World (2017 NTV edition) (Lowery Cruthers (Jake Johnson))
S. Darko (Jeremy Frame (Jackson Rathbone))
Sabrina the Teenage Witch (Harvey Kinkle (Nate Richert))
Stand by Me (1989 Fuji TV edition) (Teddy Duchamp (Corey Feldman))

Animation
The Incredibles  (Young Buddy Pine/IncrediBoy)
Peter Pan (Peter Pan) [1984 Buena Vista version]
Tom & Jerry (Real Estate Rat)

References

External links
 

Mitsuo Iwata at the Seiyuu database

1967 births
Living people
Across Entertainment voice actors
Aoni Production voice actors
Japanese male child actors
Japanese male pop singers
Japanese male video game actors
Japanese male voice actors
Male voice actors from Saitama Prefecture
20th-century Japanese male actors
21st-century Japanese male actors
20th-century Japanese male singers
20th-century Japanese singers
21st-century Japanese male singers
21st-century Japanese singers
People from Tokorozawa, Saitama